Events in the year 1961 in Portugal.

Incumbents
President: Américo Tomás 
Prime Minister: António de Oliveira Salazar

Events
 23 January - Santa Maria hijacking
 Baixa de Cassanje revolt
 30 May - Viasa Flight 897
 12 November - Legislative election
 18–19 December - Indian annexation of Goa

Sport
In association football, for the first-tier league seasons, see 1960–61 Primeira Divisão and 1961–62 Primeira Divisão; for the Taça de Portugal seasons, see 1960–61 Taça de Portugal and 1961–62 Taça de Portugal. 
 9 July - Taça de Portugal Final

References

 
Years of the 20th century in Portugal